Bai Ling (born October 10, 1966) is a Chinese-American actress known for her work in the films The Crow, Nixon, Red Corner, Crank: High Voltage, Dumplings, Wild Wild West, Anna and the King, Southland Tales, and Maximum Impact, as well as TV shows Entourage and Lost. Notably, she won the Best Supporting Actress awards at the 2004 Hong Kong Film Awards and the 2004 Golden Horse Awards in Taiwan for her role in Dumplings.

Early life
Bai was born in Chengdu. Her father, Bai Yuxiang, was a musician in the People's Liberation Army, and later a music teacher. Her mother, Chen Binbin, was a dancer, stage actress, and literature teacher at Sichuan University; Bai's maternal grandfather was a military officer of the Kuomintang army, thus was persecuted during the Cultural Revolution. In the early 1980s, Bai Ling's parents divorced, and her mother married renowned writer Xu Chi. Bai Ling has one older sister, Bai Jie, who works for the Chinese tax bureau, and a younger brother, Bai Chen, who emigrated to Japan and works for an American company.

Bai has described herself as a very shy child who found that she best expressed herself through acting and performing. During the Cultural Revolution (1966–1976), she learned how to perform by participating in eight model plays, at her elementary school shows. After her graduation from middle school, Bai was sent to do labor work at Shuangliu, on the outskirts of Chengdu.

In 1978, after graduating from high school, she passed the People's Liberation Army's exams, and became an artist soldier in Nyingchi Prefecture, Tibet. Her main activity there was entertaining in the musical theater. She also served briefly as an Army nurse. Bai later stated that during her time in Tibet, other female performers and she were regularly plied with alcohol and sexually abused by older male officers, including one instance of rape that led to a pregnancy she aborted. She cites this period of sexual abuse for her subsequent struggles with alcohol addiction. Subsequently, Bai spent some time in a mental hospital.

Soon after her release from the hospital, in 1981, Bai joined People's Art Theater of Chengdu, and became a professional actress. Her performance as a young man in the stage play Yueqin and Little Tiger drew the attention of movie director Teng Wenji (滕文骥), which gained her first movie role in On the Beach (1985), as a village girl who becomes a factory worker and struggled against her father's will for her to marry her cousin.

In later years, she appeared in several movies. She temporarily moved to New York in 1991 to attend New York University's film department as a visiting scholar, but later obtained a special visa that allowed her to remain in the United States until she became a U.S. citizen in 1999.

Career

Bai began her acting career in China, appearing in several Chinese feature films. In 1984, she made her film debut as a fishing village girl in the movie On the Beach (海滩). Later, she filmed several other movies, including Suspended Sentence (缓期执行), Yueyue (月月), and Tears in Suzhou (泪洒姑苏) without much attention. She became famous after playing a girl with a psychological disorder who has an affair with her doctor, in the film The Shining Arc (弧光), directed by Zhang Junzhao (张军钊), her most highly acclaimed role in the Chinese film industry. In 1991, Bai moved to the United States, where she appeared in a number of American films and television shows.

Bai's first major American film role was in The Crow (1994), where she played the half sister/lover of the main villain, Top Dollar. In 1997, she played the lead female role, opposite Richard Gere, in the American film Red Corner. The New York Times praised Bai Ling's performance, saying that she gave the film "not only grace, but also substantial gravity". For her role in Red Corner, she received the National Board of Review Freedom for Breakthrough Female Performance and the San Diego Film Critics Society Award for Best Actress. The film was critical of human rights abuse in China, and as a result, Bai Ling's Chinese citizenship was revoked. She later became a U.S. citizen.

Bai was named one of Peoples 50 Most Beautiful People in the World in 1998. She shaved off her hair, which was longer than 36 in (90 cm) for her role in Anna and the King, and is widely known in Thailand as "Tuptim", her character's name from the film, though the film is officially banned because of its depiction of the King of Siam. She filmed scenes for Star Wars: Episode III – Revenge of the Sith (2005) as Senator Bana Breemu, but her role was cut during editing. She claimed that this was because she posed naked in the June 2005 issue of Playboy magazine, whose appearance on newsstands coincided with the movie's May 2005 release, but director George Lucas denied this, stating that the cut had been made more than a year earlier. Her scenes were included in the deleted scenes feature of the DVD release.

In 2004, Bai made a comeback to Chinese cinema, co-starring with Hong Kong actress Miriam Yeung in independent filmmaker Fruit Chan's horror thriller Dumplings. Her portrayal of the villainous local chef Aunt Mei in the film earned her the 2005 Hong Kong Film Award for Best Supporting Actress, and led to her renewed popularity among the Chinese film audience. In the same year, she also received critical acclaim for her performance in another independent movie, The Beautiful Country, co-starring Nick Nolte, and directed by Hans Petter Moland.

Later in 2005, Bai was a member of the official jury at the 55th Berlin International Film Festival. On television, she was a cast member on the VH1 program called But Can They Sing?. Also in 2005, Bai guest-starred in season two of Entourage in which she played a love interest of Vincent Chase (Adrian Grenier).

In 2007, she starred as Coco in the film adaptation of the controversial Chinese contemporary novel Shanghai Baby, which premiered at Cannes Film Festival, and also guest-starred in one episode ("Stranger in a Strange Land") of the show Lost. Since 2007, she has appeared in a number of films, including Love Ranch, Crank: High Voltage, and A Beautiful Life, although she became more well known for her red-carpet appearances and outrageous fashions.

In 2013, Bai enjoyed a career resurgence with the movie The Gauntlet (a.k.a. Game of Assassins), which earned her the Best Actress award at the Los Angeles Cinema Festival of Hollywood, and at the 2014 Asians on Film Festival. Also, for Speed Dragon, she received the Best Feature Film Award at the New York International Independent Film and Video Festival. In late 2014, Bai starred alongside David Arquette in The Key, Jefery Levy's adaptation of the novel by Nobel Prize laureate Jun'ichirō Tanizaki. In October 2014, Bai was a member of the jury in the "India Gold 2014" section of the Mumbai Film Festival.

Personal life
On February 14, 2008, Bai was arrested at Los Angeles International Airport for shoplifting. Bai stated it was an "emotionally crazy" day due to the breakup of a relationship, and was ordered to pay a fine and penalties after pleading guilty in March 2008 to disturbing the peace.

In a 2009 interview, Bai claimed that she is from the Moon, where her grandmother lives. "I'm not really in reality. I'm in my own universe and my mind is a million miles somewhere else", she stated, further explaining: "Why I feel like I come from the Moon is because my mother told me I was found somewhere". She believes that when she looks up at the Moon, she can often spot her grandmother there, still living in her childhood home.

In 2011, she appeared in the fifth season of the VH1 reality television series Celebrity Rehab with Dr. Drew, which documented her recovery from alcohol addiction. Bai is openly bisexual. In a 2011 interview regarding her public image and troubles over the years, she stated:

Filmography

Television

Video Games

Music Video

Discography

Singles
"Rehab" (2011)
"U Touch Me, I Don't Know U" (2011)
"I Love U My Valentine" (2012)
"Tuesday Night 8pm" (2012)

Music videos
"Rehab" (2011)
"U Touch Me, I Don't Know U" (2011)
"I Love U My Valentine" (2012)
"Tuesday Night 8pm" (2012)

References

Further reading
 Original text from Famous Chinese Women, licensed under the GNU Free Documentation License.
 CNN interview with Bai Ling

External links

1966 births
Living people
American film actresses
American television actresses
Bisexual actresses
American actresses of Chinese descent
People's Republic of China LGBT people
Chinese emigrants to the United States
Chinese soldiers
Tisch School of the Arts alumni
Actresses from Chengdu
People's Liberation Army personnel
Women soldiers
20th-century American actresses
21st-century American actresses
20th-century Chinese actresses
21st-century Chinese actresses
Chinese film actresses
Lee Strasberg Theatre and Film Institute alumni
American LGBT people of Asian descent
American bisexual actors
Chinese bisexual people
Chinese television actresses
People with acquired American citizenship
20th-century Chinese military personnel